Trần Lãm (died 967) was a warlord of Vietnam during the Period of the 12 Warlords.

Lãm was an ethnic Việt from Guangdong. He held Bố Hải Khấu, Kỳ Bố, Thái Bình Province, and titled himself Trần Minh Công (陳明公). He was the strongest warlord of Vietnam in that time. Đinh Bộ Lĩnh swore allegiance to him, and became adoptive son of him. His territory and troops was annexed by Đinh Bộ Lĩnh after his death.

References

967 deaths
Year of birth unknown
10th-century Vietnamese people
People from Thái Bình province
Vietnamese people of Chinese descent
Anarchy of the 12 Warlords